The European Festival Awards were initiated in 2010 by the European festival association Yourope and the festival website Virtual Festivals Europe. The awards are presented annually in January of the following year at the European music conference and showcase festival Eurosonic Noorderslag in Groningen, The Netherlands. The European Festival Awards are aimed at European Festivals and their organizations, who make an important contribution to society. There are awards in 13 categories such as “Best big European festival” and “Best European festival line-up”.

Winners of the European Festival Awards

2019

2018

2017

2016

2015

2014

2013

2012

2011

2010

2009

References

External links
 Website European Festival Awards
 Website Eurosonic Noorderslag

Award ceremonies
Festival
Pan-European music organizations